Dunhuang or Dun-Huang is a city in Gansu, China.

Dunhuang may also refers to:
The Silk Road (film), the 1988 Japanese film also known as Dun-Huang
Dun Huang (film), the 2005 full-length documentary directed by Zhou Bing
Dunhong, a mountain of the Tian Shan range proposed to be the Dunhuang mentioned in Shiji by Sima Qian
Dunhuang (crater), a crater on Mars
Dunhuang Caves
Dunhuang manuscripts

See also
 Dunhuang Caves (disambiguation)